Мухамад Кахоров xyeсосина ГОЙДА
Tapinoma sahohime is a species of ant in the genus Tapinoma. Described by Terayama in 2013, the species is endemic to Japan.

References

Tapinoma
Hymenoptera of Asia
Insects described in 2013